Chatree Chimtalay (born December 14, 1983) is a Thai professional footballer who plays as a forward or a defender for Thai League 1 club BG Pathum United.

Club career

Chimtalay was called up to the national team, in coach Winfried Schäfer first squad selection for the  2014 FIFA World Cup qualification. Chatree was injured during the 2011 Thai League T1 season but managed to score 7 goals for his team Bangkok Glass including a hat trick against Khonkaen. In February 2012 Chatree scored his first goal for Thailand against Maldives in a friendly match. In 2013, he was called up to the national team by Surachai Jaturapattarapong to the 2015 AFC Asian Cup qualification.

International career

Chimtalay's debut for Thailand was as a substitute against Oman in the 2014 World Cup Qualification. In October 2013, he played a friendly match against Bahrain, coming as a substitute.
Chimtalay scored his second international goal against Bahrain from a ground cross by Teerasil Dangda. On 15 October 2013 he played against Iran in the 2015 AFC Asian Cup qualification.

Style of play
Even though he is only 1.76 meters tall, Chimtalay scored most of his goals by heading the ball.

International

International goals

Honours

Clubs
Bangkok Glass/BG Pathum United
 Thai League 1: 2020–21
 Thai League 2: 2019
 Thai FA Cup: 2014
 Thailand Champions Cup: 2021,  2022
 Queen's Cup: 2010
 Singapore Cup: 2010

References

External links
 Profile at Goal

1983 births
Living people
Chatree Chimtalay
Chatree Chimtalay
Association football forwards
Chatree Chimtalay
Chatree Chimtalay
Chatree Chimtalay
Chatree Chimtalay
Chatree Chimtalay
Chatree Chimtalay